Paul Adegboyega Olawoore (Ikuri, Nigeria, 30 November 1961 – Ilorin, 1 January 2022) was a Nigerian Roman Catholic prelate. He was bishop of the Roman Catholic Diocese of Ilorin from 2019 until his death on New Year's Day, at the age of 60.

References

1961 births
2022 deaths
21st-century Roman Catholic bishops in Nigeria
Roman Catholic bishops of Ilorin
Bishops appointed by Pope Francis